The  is a list of 100 castles, intended as a sequel of 100 Fine Castles of Japan.

Hokkaidō region

Tōhoku region

Kantō region

Kōshin'etsu region

Hokuriku region

Tōkai region

Kansai region

Chūgoku region

Shikoku region

Kyūshū region

Okinawa region

See also

List of castles in Japan
List of National Treasures of Japan (castles)

Notes

External links
Japan Castle Foundation 

Lists of castles in Japan